Anime Festival (formerly Madman Anime Festival or MadFest) was an annual Australian anime and Japanese culture convention held in Melbourne, Perth, Brisbane and Sydney. The convention was organised by Madman Anime. The convention was inaugurated in 2016 and held in Melbourne Convention and Exhibition Centre as a two-day event from the 3–4 September 2016 in Melbourne. The convention was later expanded to Perth and Brisbane in 2017 after a successful inaugural event, with each event held a few months apart, and to Sydney in 2019.

On 29 March 2022, it was announced that Anime Festival would be replaced with Crunchyroll Expo Australia, with the first event scheduled for 17–18 September 2022. Subsequently, all previously scheduled events were cancelled.

Event history

Notes

References 

Anime conventions in Australia